"Sleepless" is a single by Swedish electronic music duo Cazzette, featuring vocoder-processed vocals from UK artist The High. It was released on 12 May 2014.

Release 
The track was initially released on May 12 on Spotify and was released on Beatport, iTunes, and Amazon the next day on May 13. An EP entitled "Sleepless (Remixes I)" was also released on iTunes June 27, 2014 and on Beatport July 7, 2014.

Track listing

Charts

Weekly charts

Year-end charts

References

2014 songs
2014 singles
House music songs
Songs written by Arash Pournouri